Ludwig van Beethoven's Piano Concerto No. 1 in C major, Op. 15, was written in 1795, then revised in 1800. It was possibly first performed by Beethoven at his first public concert in Vienna on 29 March 1795. It was first published in 1801 in Vienna with dedication to his pupil Princess Anna Louise Barbara Odescalchi (née Countess von Keglević), known to her friends as "Babette".

Although this was Beethoven's first piano concerto to be published, it was actually his third attempt at the genre, following an unpublished piano concerto in E-flat major of 1784 and the Piano Concerto No. 2. The latter was published in 1801 in Leipzig after the Piano Concerto No. 1, but was composed over a period of years, perhaps beginning ca. 1788.

Movements 

As with the Piano Concerto No. 2, this C major concerto reflects Beethoven's assimilation of the styles of Mozart and Haydn, while its abrupt harmonic shifts demonstrate Beethoven's musical personality. It adheres to the concerto variant of sonata form and is scored for solo piano and an orchestra consisting of flute, 2 oboes, 2 clarinets, 2 bassoons, 2 horns, 2 trumpets, timpani, and strings. The flute, oboes, trumpets, and timpani are tacet during the second movement.

I. Allegro con brio

Tempo:  = 144

The first movement is in sonata form, but with an added orchestral exposition, a cadenza, and a coda. It has a main theme repeated many times, and there are several subordinate themes. The orchestral exposition changes keys many times, but the second exposition is mainly in G major. The development starts in E-flat major, then modulates to C minor, which ends with an octave glissando. The recapitulation is in C major.

There are three options for the cadenza to this movement, which vary in length and difficulty. The coda is played by the orchestra alone. Performances vary in length from fourteen to eighteen minutes.

II. Largo

The second movement is in the key of A-flat major, in this context a key relatively remote from the concerto's opening key of C major. If the movement adhered to traditional form, its key would be F major, the subdominant key, or in G major, the dominant key. The clarinets are given an unusually prominent role in this movement, having the melody as often as violins.

Like many slow movements, this movement is in ternary (ABA) form. Its opening A section presents several themes that are then developed in the middle B section.

Typical performances last more than ten minutes

III. Rondo. Allegro scherzando

The third movement is a seven-part sonata rondo (ABACABA), a traditional third-movement form in classical concerti. The piano states the main theme, which is then repeated by the orchestra. The two B sections (subordinate themes) are in G major and C major respectively. The middle section is in A minor.

Two short cadenzas are indicated by Beethoven in this movement, one just before the final return to the main theme, and another one immediately before the end of the movement, which finishes with a striking dynamic contrast; the piano plays a melody quietly, but the orchestra then ends the movement forcefully.

The movement typically lasts around eight to nine minutes.

Alternative cadenzas
German pianist Wilhelm Kempff wrote his own cadenzas for both the first and last movements and played these in his various recordings of the work. Canadian pianist Glenn Gould also wrote his own cadenza, which was published by Barger and Barclay, and recorded for EMI in 1996 by Lars Vogt with the City of Birmingham Symphony Orchestra under Simon Rattle

Recordings

References

Notes

Sources

External links
 
 
 Sheet music, Musopen

01
1797 compositions
Compositions in C major
Music dedicated to students or teachers